The Visayan babbler (Sterrhoptilus nigrocapitatus), formerly conspecific with the Calabarzon babbler, is a species of bird in the family Zosteropidae. It is endemic to the Philippines. It is found on Samar, Leyte and Bohol.

Its natural habitat is subtropical or tropical moist lowland forest.

References

Collar, N. J. & Robson, C. 2007. Family Timaliidae (Babblers)  pp. 70 – 291 in; del Hoyo, J., Elliott, A. & Christie, D.A. eds. Handbook of the Birds of the World, Vol. 12. Picathartes to Tits and Chickadees. Lynx Edicions, Barcelona.

Visayan babbler
Visayan babbler
Taxa named by Joseph Beal Steere
Taxonomy articles created by Polbot